The 2020 season was the 106th in Sociedade Esportiva Palmeiras' existence. This season Palmeiras participated in the Campeonato Paulista, Copa Libertadores, Copa do Brasil and the Série A and also the FIFA Club World Cup.

Squad information

Copa Libertadores squad

Notes

Source: UOL, ge and Lance!

Transfers

Transfers in

Transfers out

Competitions

Overview

Florida Cup

Campeonato Paulista

First stage 
Palmeiras were drawn into Group B. On 16 March 2020, it was announced that the tournament had been postponed due to COVID-19 pandemic. On 16 July, the return of the competition was announced by the Federação Paulista de Futebol.

Quarter-final

Semi-final

Finals

Copa Libertadores

Group stage 

The draw for the qualifying stages and group stage was held on 17 December 2019, 20:30 PYST (UTC−3), at the CONMEBOL Convention Centre in Luque, Paraguay.

On 12 March 2020, CONMEBOL announced that the tournament would be temporarily suspended after matchday 2 due to the COVID-19 pandemic, with matches on matchday 3, originally scheduled for 17–19 March 2020, postponed to a later date to be confirmed. On 18 March 2020, CONMEBOL announced that the tournament would be suspended until 5 May 2020. On 17 April 2020, CONMEBOL announced that the tournament would be suspended indefinitely, and no date had been set for its resumption. On 10 July 2020, CONMEBOL announced the new schedule for the remainder of the competition.

Round of 16 

The draw for the round of 16 was held on 23 October 2020, 12:00 PYT (UTC−3).

Quarterfinal

Semifinal

Final

Série A

Standings

Result by round

Matches 
The schedule was released on 27 February 2020. Due to COVID-19 pandemic in Brazil the tournament was rescheduled, starting on 8 August 2020 and concluding on 25 February 2021.

Copa do Brasil

Round of 16 
The draw for the round of 16 was held on 1 October 2020.

Quarterfinal 
The draw for the quarter-finals was held on 6 November 2020.

Semifinal 
The draw to determine the home and away teams for both legs was held at CBF headquarters on 24 November 2020.

Final 

The draw to determine the home and away teams for both legs was held at CBF headquarters on 14 January 2021.

FIFA Club World Cup 

Palmeiras qualified for the Club World Cup by winning the Copa Libertadores.

Semifinal

Third place match

Statistics

Overall statistics

Goalscorers 
In italic players who left the team in mid-season.

References

External links 
 Official site 

2020
Palmeiras
Palmeiras